Netechma nigricunea is a species of moth of the family Tortricidae. It is found in Ecuador (Morona-Santiago Province) and Peru.

The ground colour of the forewings is white dotted with black and tinged with greyish in the middle postmedially. The markings are black. The hindwings are brownish grey.

Etymology
The species name refers to maculation of forewings and is derived from Latin niger (meaning black) and cuneus (meaning a wedge).

References

External links

Moths described in 2006
Moths of South America
nigricunea